Lily Anderson (December 15, 1988) is a Latinx author of young adult fiction, best known for her Indie's Choice Book Award-nominated novel Undead Girl Gang.

Personal life 
Anderson is an Afrolatina of Puerto Rican descent. She has been a Wiccan since she was eight years old. After she dropped out of college at age 18, Anderson wrote her first book and decided she wanted to become a published writer.

Anderson grew up doing theatre and is a self-proclaimed theatre geek, saying that she did her first Shakespeare play when she was 12 or 13 years old, which ultimately led to her writing both novels in her debut young adult series The Only Thing Worse Than Me Is You as retellings of Oscar Wilde's The Importance of Being Earnest and William Shakespeare's Much Ado about Nothing.

Anderson is an elementary school librarian and lives in Northern California.

She names American screenwriter and director Shonda Rimes and American plus-size model Tess Holliday as the sources of some of her inspiration.

Selected works 
She drew on her own experience as a Wiccan for her novel Undead Girl Gang, in which a teenage Wiccan resurrects her dead best friend. Other inspirations for the novel include dark comedy teenage obsessions of hers, namely the movies The Craft, Heathers and Death Becomes Her.

Bibliography 
Series

Messina Academy Duology

 The Only Thing Worse Than Me Is You (St. Martin's Griffin, 2016)
 Not Now Not Ever (Wednesday Books, 2017)

Standalones

 Undead Girl Gang (Razorbill, 2018)
 The Throwback List (Hyperion Avenue, 2021)
 Scout's Honor (Henry Holt, 2022)
 Big Bad, a Buffy the Vampire Slayer novel (Hyperion Avenue, 2022)

Awards 
Nominated

 2019 Indies Choice for Undead Girl Gang
 2022 Michael L. Printz Honor for "Scout's Honor"

References 

Living people
21st-century American novelists
African-American librarians
American women librarians
American librarians
Hispanic and Latino American librarians
Wiccan novelists
1988 births
21st-century American women writers
21st-century African-American women writers
21st-century African-American writers
20th-century African-American people
20th-century African-American women
American Wiccans